A digital duplicator, also known as a printer-duplicator, is a printing technology designed for high-volume print jobs (100 copies or more). Digital duplicators can provide a reliable and cost efficient alternative to toner-based copiers or offset printing equipment.

The digital duplicator begins by digitally scanning the original and then transferring it to a master template through a thermal imaging process. Then the master is automatically wrapped around a print cylinder, where the ink is drawn through the perforations in the master creating the print.

Digital duplicators are known for their high speed in comparison to other printing methods.  They are able to produce anywhere from 45 to 180 prints per minute, while maintaining a per page cost that can be as low as 1/3 of a cent. They are also considered very reliable because they do not use heat or copier components, such as toner.

Office equipment
Printing devices